Room of Lights is the debut studio album by Crime & the City Solution, released on October 27, 1986 through Mute Records.

Reception

The album received positive reviews upon release, much like the EPs that preceded it. Byron Coley wrote that the album "touches a dim, forgotten nerve-root lurking deep in the bowel of a mud-wad giant. The pace and instrumentation both seem poured from a jug of arsenic-laced dog-honey and Simon's voice and lyrics strip nude a whole new patch of soul-turf [...] I've heard that there're people who don't like this, but I don't believe it. I can believe people not liking the Doors, but [...]" David Sheridan found the album to feature "a noticeably heavier and thicker sound. With the predominance of slow tempos, Bonney's somewhat unattractive voice and the overly serious lyrics, supplied mostly by violinist Bronwyn Adams, the disc is laboriously endurance-defying. The band seems to be somewhat stunted developmentally; these eight songs are merely variations on previously introduced themes."

"Following on the heels of two successful EPs," writes Amy Hanson, "Crime & the City Solution turned around to record some of their best material for Room of Lights. With violinist Bronwyn Adams added to the camp, the band acted as dynamically jagged counterparts to their peers; the music they now embraced was a rough and ready rock that slotted itself nicely under a gothic canvas -- they were and remain post-punk's forgotten kings."

In popular culture

The band was shown performing the song "Six Bells Chime" on Wim Wenders' 1987 film Wings of Desire.

Track listing

Personnel 
Crime & the City Solution
Simon Bonney – vocals
Epic Soundtracks – drums, piano on "No Money, No Honey" and "Hey Sinkiller"
Mick Harvey – piano, guitar, organ on "Right Man, Wrong Man", Tom-toms on "Her Room of Lights"
Harry Howard – bass guitar
Rowland S. Howard – guitar, organ on "Hey Sinkiller" and "Adventure", piano on "Untouchable"
Production and additional personnel
Bronwyn Adams – illustrations, violin on "The Brother Song"
Emily Andersen – photography
Sven Borman – assistant engineering
Tony Cohen – production, engineering
Flood – production, engineering, photography
Peter Gruchot – photography
Peter Milne – photography
Rowland S. Howard*scarped

Charts

References

External links 
 

1986 debut albums
Crime & the City Solution albums
Albums produced by Tony Cohen
Albums produced by Flood (producer)
Mute Records albums